Paul Richardson (born 25 October 1949) is an English former footballer who played in the Football League for Blackpool, Chester, Nottingham Forest, Sheffield United, Swansea City, Swindon Town and Stoke City.

Career
Richardson was born in Selston and began his career with Nottingham Forest where he quickly established himself as a ball playing midfielder. He became a regular member Forest's squad until Brian Clough took over as manager in January 1975. With Clough wanting to bring in his own players Richardson was sold to Third Division Chester having made 249 appearances scoring 21 goals for Forest.

He spent just one season at Chester, helping them reach the FA Cup fifth round for the first time, before George Eastham signed him for Stoke City in the summer of 1977. He became a key player for Stoke in the Second Division playing 34 times in 1977–78. Under new manager Alan Durban Richardson played 46 games in 1978–79 scoring seven goals including the goal which clinched promotion. Stoke needed to beat Notts County on the final day of the season to confirm promotion but with 88 minutes gone the score was still 0–0, until Richardson headed Stoke to a 1–0 victory and a dramatic promotion. He played 40 matches in 1979–80 and 22 in 1980–81 before leaving for Sheffield United in August 1981. He helped the Blades win the Fourth Division title in 1981–82. He later enjoyed short spells at Blackpool, Swindon Town and Swansea City. He later worked for the BT Group and also managed non-league side Fairford Town.

Career statistics
Source:

References

External links
 

1949 births
Living people
English footballers
Stoke City F.C. players
Blackpool F.C. players
Chester City F.C. players
Gloucester City A.F.C. players
Gloucester City A.F.C. managers
Nottingham Forest F.C. players
Sheffield United F.C. players
Swansea City A.F.C. players
Swindon Town F.C. players
English Football League players
People from Selston
Footballers from Nottinghamshire
English football managers
Fairford Town F.C. managers
Swindon Town F.C. non-playing staff
Association football midfielders